Melodrama is the third studio album by Finnish Britpop band The Crash, released in 2003.

Track listing

All songs have been written by Teemu Brunila

Band members
Teemu Brunila – vocals, guitar, keyboard
Samuli Haataja – bass guitar
Erkki Kaila – drums
Tomi Mäkilä – keyboard

References

2003 albums
The Crash (band) albums